Kushnarev or Kushnaryov is a surname  or , female form Kushnareva or Kushnaryova.  Notable people with the surname include:

Vitaly Kushnarev (born 1975), Russian politician
Yuri Kushnarev
Yevhen Kushnaryov (1951–2007), Ukrainian politician

Russian-language surnames
Ukrainian-language surnames